Penicillium duclauxii is an anamorph species of the genus of Penicillium which produces xenoclauxin and duclauxin.

See also
 List of Penicillium species

References

Further reading
 
 
 
 
 
 

duclauxii
Fungi described in 1891